Stigmella desperatella is a moth of the family Nepticulidae. It is found from Estonia to the Pyrenees, Italy and Bulgaria, and from Great Britain to Ukraine.

The wingspan is 4–5 mm. Adults are on wing in June.

The larvae feed on Malus baccata, Malus domestica, Malus sylvestris and Pyrus communis. They mine the leaves of their host plant. The mine starts as a narrow corridor, often following a vein or the leaf margin. Later sections are much wider and contorted, often forming a secondary blotch. The frass is concentrated in a narrow central line. There may be several mines in a single leaf.

External links
Fauna Europaea
bladmineerders.nl

Nepticulidae
Moths of Europe
Moths described in 1856